is a former Japanese football player. She played for Japan national team.

National team career
Iwata was born on January 19, 1954. In June 1981, when she was 17 years old, she was selected for the Japan national team to play in the 1981 AFC Championship. She debuted against Thailand at this competition on June 11. She played in two matches at this championship. In September, she also played against Italy. However Japan was defeated by a score of 0–9. That was the greatest defeat in the history of the Japan national team. She played three games for Japan in 1981.

National team statistics

References

1954 births
Living people
Japanese women's footballers
Japan women's international footballers
Nissan FC Ladies players
Women's association footballers not categorized by position